Operation Atlas was a terrorist-attack drill/mockup that took place on 4 June 2005, at the Logan airport in Boston, Massachusetts. The massive operation involved real airplanes and assault teams, as in an authentic case. In the plot, a band of "terrorists", "hell-bent on death and destruction," successfully smuggled weapons and explosives onto a commercial airliner, a United Airlines Boeing 757 and threatened to use the aircraft as a missile.

Operation Atlas - essentially a war game - was designed to help more than 50 emergency response, law enforcement, and aviation organizations develop coordination and communications in preparation for a real terrorist attack. These included Massport officials, Federal Air Marshals Service (FAMS), the Department of Homeland Security, the Coast Guard Boston Homeland Security, the Federal Aviation Administration 
(FAA), United Airlines, the  Federal Bureau of Investigation (FBI), the Transportation Security Administration (TSA), the Red Cross, and others.

Drama 
The fictional drama begins in Paris, where the terrorists start out by kidnapping family of the airport security screeners. They then succeed in smuggling weapons on board.

References 

2005 in aviation
2005 in Boston
Massachusetts Port Authority
Logan International Airport